Husker du? (Norwegian for "Do you remember?") was a television music program aimed at senior citizens broadcast between the years 1971 and 1985 by the Norwegian Broadcasting Corporation. It was initiated and largely hosted by Ivar Ruste, accompanied by Odd Grythe initially and Børt-Erik Thoresen after Grythe's health deteriorated. When Ruste retired due to ill health, Thoreson merged the show with a classical-music program he had hosted, continuing until mid-1985. Ruste's death earlier that year influenced Thoreson's decision to conclude the program; at that point 130 programs in the series had been broadcast, with several recordings from the show being published for EMI.

1970s Norwegian television series
1980s Norwegian television series
1971 Norwegian television series debuts
1985 Norwegian television series endings
NRK original programming